Yaeko is a female Japanese given name.

People
, Ainu waka poet and evangelist.
, Japanese nurse, wife of Joseph Hardy Neesima
, Japanese actress
, Japanese novelist
, Japanese volleyball player 
, Japanese woman kidnapped by North Korea
 Yaeko Uehara, a geiko and Mineko Iwasaki's older sister.

References

Japanese feminine given names